The Atlantic Seaboard Fall Line, or Fall Zone, is a  escarpment where the Piedmont and Atlantic coastal plain meet in the eastern United States. Much of the Atlantic Seaboard fall line passes through areas where no evidence of faulting is present.

The fall line marks the geologic boundary of hard metamorphosed terrain—the product of the Taconic orogeny—and the sandy, relatively flat alluvial plain of the upper continental shelf, formed of unconsolidated Cretaceous and Cenozoic sediments. Examples of Fall Zone features include the Potomac River's Little Falls and the rapids in Richmond, Virginia, where the James River falls across a series of rapids down to its own tidal estuary.

Before navigation improvements such as locks, the fall line was generally the head of navigation on rivers due to their rapids or waterfalls, and the necessary portage around them. Numerous cities initially formed along the fall line because of the easy river transportation to seaports, as well the availability of water power to operate mills and factories, thus bringing together river traffic and industrial labor. U.S. Route 1 and I-95 link many of the fall-line cities.

In 1808, Treasury Secretary Albert Gallatin noted the significance of the fall line as an obstacle to improved national communication and commerce between the Atlantic seaboard and the western river systems:

Notable cities
Some cities that lie along the Piedmont–Coastal Plain fall line include the following (from north to south):
 Edison, New Jersey, and East Brunswick, New Jersey on the Raritan River
 Princeton, New Jersey, on the Millstone River
 Trenton, New Jersey, on the Delaware River.
 Philadelphia, Pennsylvania, on the Schuylkill River.
 Wilmington, Delaware, on the Brandywine River.
 Perryville, Maryland, and Havre de Grace, Maryland, on the Susquehanna River/head of Chesapeake Bay.
 Baltimore, Maryland, on Herring Run, Jones Falls, and Gwynns Falls.
 Elkridge, Maryland, on the Patapsco River.
 Laurel, Maryland, on the Patuxent River.
 Washington, D.C., on the Potomac River.
 Occoquan, Virginia, on the Occoquan River.
 Fredericksburg, Virginia on the Rappahannock River.
 Richmond, Virginia, on the James River.
 Petersburg, Virginia, on the Appomattox River.
 Weldon, North Carolina, and Roanoke Rapids, North Carolina, on the Roanoke River
 Rocky Mount, North Carolina, on the Tar River.
 Raleigh, North Carolina, on the Neuse River.
 Fayetteville, North Carolina, on the Cape Fear River.
 Lumberton, North Carolina, on the Lumber River.
 Cheraw, South Carolina, on the Pee Dee River.
 Camden, South Carolina, on the Wateree River.
 Columbia, South Carolina, on the Congaree River.
 Augusta, Georgia, on the Savannah River.
 Milledgeville, Georgia, on the Oconee River.
 Macon, Georgia, on the Ocmulgee River.
 Columbus, Georgia, on the Chattahoochee River.
 Tallassee, Alabama, on the Tallapoosa River
 Wetumpka, Alabama, on the Coosa River
 Tuscaloosa, Alabama, on the Black Warrior River

References

East Coast of the United States
Escarpments of the United States